Merchants of Truth: The Business of News and the Fight for Facts is a 2019 book by Jill Abramson that follows four news organizations—The New York Times, The Washington Post, BuzzFeed, and Vice News—through changes in news media technology and standards over the course of the 21st century. The author was formerly Executive Editor of The New York Times.

Multiple writers and journalists posted comparisons between previous texts and that of Abramson's book, which they presented as plagiarized. She responded by saying that she did not think plagiarism was an issue in her book.
However, in an interview with NPR's Michel Martin, Abramson admitted she "fell short" in attributing her sources for some passages of the book.

Merchants of Truth was also criticized for various factual mistakes, causing the Columbia Journalism Review to highlight the book as an example of "the perils of publishing without a fact-checking net." Abramson expressed regret about the errors, but argued that "in a 500-page book I fear it’s inevitable that there are going to be some."

Reception
The review aggregator website Book Marks reported that, out of a sample of 19 reviews, five critics gave the book a "rave" review,  eight critics expressed "positive" impressions, and five expressed "mixed" impressions, and one of the critics "panned" the book.

Commercial reception of the book has been poor, due in part to the plagiarism controversy, with fewer than 3,000 copies being sold in its first week, according to BookScan.

References

Further reading

External links
 
After Words interview with Abramson on Merchants of Truth, February 16, 2019, C-SPAN
 The author speaks about her book Recode Media and Columbia Journalism Review

2019 controversies in the United States
2019 non-fiction books
American non-fiction books
Books about journalism
Books involved in plagiarism controversies
BuzzFeed
English-language books
History of journalism
Mass media-related controversies in the United States
Simon & Schuster books
The New York Times
The Washington Post
Vice Media